was a legendary Japanese empress who ruled as a regent following her husband's death in 200 AD. Both the Kojiki and the Nihon Shoki (collectively known as the Kiki) record events that took place during Jingū's alleged lifetime. Legends say that after seeking revenge on the people who murdered her husband, she then turned her attention to a "promised land". Jingū is thus considered to be a controversial monarch by historians in terms of her alleged invasion of the Korean Peninsula. This was in turn possibly used as justification for imperial expansion during the Meiji period. The records state that Jingū gave birth to a baby boy whom she named Homutawake three years after he was conceived by her late husband. 

Jingū's reign is conventionally considered to have been from 201 to 269 AD, and was considered to be the 15th Japanese imperial ruler until the Meiji period. Modern historians have come to the conclusion that the name "Jingū" was used by later generations to describe this legendary Empress. It has also been proposed that Jingū actually reigned later than she is attested. While the location of Jingū's grave (if any) is unknown, she is traditionally venerated at a kofun and at a shrine. It is accepted today that Empress Jingū reigned as a regent until her son became Emperor Ōjin upon her death. She was additionally the last de facto ruler of the Yayoi period.

Legendary narrative

The Japanese have traditionally accepted this regent's historical existence, and a mausoleum (misasagi) for Jingū is currently maintained. These chronicles include legends and myths, as well as potential historical facts that have since been exaggerated and/or distorted over time. Her father was named , and her mother . At some point in time she wed Tarashinakahiko (or Tarashinakatsuhiko), who would later be known as Emperor Chūai and bore him one child under a now disputed set of events. Jingū would serve as "Empress consort" during Chūai's reign until his death in 200 AD.

Emperor Chūai died in 200 AD having been killed directly or indirectly in battle by rebel forces. Okinagatarashi-hime no Mikoto then turned her rage on the rebels whom she vanquished in a fit of revenge. She led an army in an invasion of a "promised land" (sometimes interpreted as lands on the Korean Peninsula), and returned to Japan victorious after three years. She then ascended the Chrysanthemum Throne as Empress Jingū, and legend continues by saying that her son was conceived but unborn when Chūai died. After those three years she gave birth to a baby boy whom she named Homutawake. The narrative of Empress Jingū invading and conquering the Korean Peninsula is now considered controversial and up for debate due to the complete lack of evidence and involvement of both the Japanese and Korean points of view. According to the Nihon Shoki, the king of Baekje gifted Jingū a Seven-Branched Sword sometime in 253 AD. Empress Jingū was the de facto ruler until her death in 269 at the age of 100. The modern traditional view is that Chūai's son (Homutawake) became the next Emperor after Jingū acted as a regent. She would have been de facto ruler in the interim.

Known information

Empress consort Jingū is regarded by historians as a legendary figure  as there is insufficient material available for further verification and study. The lack of this information has made her very existence open to debate. If Empress Jingū was an actual figure, investigations of her tomb suggest she may have been a regent in the late 4th century AD or late 5th century AD. There is no evidence to suggest that the title tennō was used during the time to which Jingū's regency has been assigned. It is certainly possible that she was a chieftain or local clan leader, and that the polity she ruled would have only encompassed a small portion of modern-day Japan. The name Jingū was more than likely assigned to her posthumously by later generations, during her lifetime she would have been called Okinaga-Tarashi respectively. Empress Jingū was later removed from the imperial lineage during the reign of Emperor Meiji as a way of making sure the lineage remained unbroken. This occurred when examining the emperors of the Northern Court and Southern Court of the fourteenth century. Focus was given on who should be the "true" ancestors of those who occupied the throne.

Gosashi kofun 
While the actual site of Jingū's grave is not known, this regent is traditionally venerated at a kofun-type Imperial tomb in Nara. This Kofun is also known as the "Gosashi tomb", and is managed by the Imperial Household Agency. The tomb was restricted from archaeology studies in 1976 as the tomb dates back to the founding of a central Japanese state under imperial rule. The Imperial Household Agency had also cited "tranquility and dignity" concerns in their decision making. Serious ethics concerns had been raised in 2000 after a massive archaeological hoax was exposed. Things changed in 2008 when Japan allowed limited access to Jingū's kofun to foreign archaeologists who were able to determine that the tomb likely dated to the 4th century AD. The examination also discovered haniwa terracotta figures. Empress Jingū is also enshrined at Sumiyoshi-taisha in Osaka, which was established in the 11th year of her reign (211 AD).

Controversy

Birth of Ōjin and Jingū's Identity
According to the Kiki, Empress Jingū gave birth to a baby boy whom she named Homutawake (aka Emperor Ōjin) following her return from Korean conquest. The legend alleges that her son was conceived but unborn when Emperor Chūai died. As three more years would pass before Homutawake was finally born, this claim appears to be mythical and symbolic rather than real. Scholar William George Aston has suggested that this claim was misinterpreted, and instead refers to a period of less than nine months containing three "years" (some seasons), e.g. three harvests. If Ōjin was an actual historical figure then historians have proposed that he ruled later than attested years of 270 to 310 AD.

Jingū's identity has since been questioned by medieval and modern scholars whom have put forward different theories. Kitabatake Chikafusa (1293–1354) and Arai Hakuseki (1657–1725) asserted that she was actually the shaman-queen Himiko. The kiki does not include any mentions of Queen Himiko, and the circumstances under which these books were written is a matter of unending debate. Even if such a person was known to the authors of the Kojiki and Nihon Shoki, they may have intentionally decided not to include her. However, they do include imperial-family shamans identified with her which include Jingū. Modern scholars such as Naitō Torajirō have stated that Jingū was actually Yamatohime-no-mikoto and that Wa armies obtained control of southern Korea. Yamatohime-no-Mikoto supposedly founded the Ise Shrine in tribute to the sun-goddess Amaterasu. While historian Higo Kazuo suggested that she is a daughter of Emperor Kōrei (Yamatototohimomosohime-no-Mikoto).

Korean Invasion

Both the Nihon Shoki and the Kojiki give accounts of how Okinaga-Tarashi (Jingū) led an army to invade a "promised land" (sometimes interpreted as lands on the Korean Peninsula). She then returned to Japan victorious after three years of conquest where she was proclaimed as Empress. The second volume of the Kojiki (中巻 or "Nakatsumaki") states that the Korean kingdom of Baekje (百済 or "Kudara") paid tribute to Japan under "Tribute from Korea". The Nihon Shoki states that Jingū conquered a region in southern Korea in the 3rd century AD naming it "Mimana". One of the main proponents of this theory was Japanese scholar Suematsu Yasukazu, who in 1949 proposed that Mimana was a Japanese colony on the Korean peninsula that existed from the 3rd until the 6th century. The Chinese Book of Song of the Liu Song dynasty also allegedly notes the Japanese presence in the Korean Peninsula, while the Book of Sui says that Japan provided military support to Baekje and Silla.

In 1883, a memorial stele for the tomb of King Gwanggaeto (374 – 413) of Goguryeo was discovered and hence named the Gwanggaeto Stele. An issue arose though, when the inscriptions describing events during the king's reign were found to be in bad condition with portions illegible. At the center of the disagreement is the "sinmyo passage" of year 391 as it can be interpreted in multiple ways. Korean scholars maintain that it states the Goguryeo subjugated Baekje and Silla, while Japanese scholars have traditionally interpreted that Wa had at one time subjugated Baekje and Silla. The stele soon caught the interest of the Imperial Japanese Army General Staff Office, who obtained a rubbed copy from its member Kageaki Sakō in 1884. They particularly became intrigued over the passage describing the king's military campaigns for the sinmyo in 391 AD. Additional research was done by some officers in the Japanese army and navy, and the rubbed copy was later published in 1889. The interpretation was made by Japanese scholars at the time that the "Wa" had occupied and controlled the Korean Peninsula. The legends of Empress Jingū's conquest of Korea could have then been used by Imperial Japan as reasoning for their annexation of Korea in 1910 as "restoring" unity between the two countries. As it was, Imperialists had already used this historical claim to justify expansion into the Korean Peninsula. 

The main issue with an invasion scenario is a lack of evidence of Jingū's rule in Korea, or the existence of Jingū as an actual historical figure. This suggests that the accounts given are either fictional or an inaccurate/misleading account of events that occurred. According to the book "From Paekchae Korea to the Origin of Yamato Japan", the Japanese had misinterpreted the Gwanggaeto Stele. The Stele was a tribute to a Korean king, but because of a lack of correct punctuation, the writing can be translated in 4 different ways. This same Stele can also be interpreted as saying Korea crossed the strait and forced Japan into subjugation, depending on where the sentence is punctuated. An investigation done by the Chinese Academy of Social Sciences in 2006 suggested that the inscription could also be interpreted as "Silla and Baekje were dependent states of Yamato Japan."

The imperialist reasoning for occupation eventually led to an emotional repulsion from Jingu after World War II had ended as she had symbolized Japan's nationalistic foreign policy. Historian Chizuko Allen notes that while these feelings are understandable, they are not academically justifiable. The overall popularity of the Jingū theory has been declining since the 1970s due to concerns raised about available evidence.

Legacy

In 1881, Empress Jingū became the first woman to be featured on a Japanese banknote. As no actual images of this legendary figure are known to exist, the representation of Jingū which was artistically contrived by Edoardo Chiossone is entirely conjectural; Chiossone used a female employee of the Government Printing Bureau as his model for Jingū. This picture was also used for 1908/14 postage stamps, the first postage stamps of Japan to show a woman. A revised design by Yoshida Toyo was used for the 1924/37 Jingū design stamps. The usage of a Jingū design ended with a new stamp series in 1939.

Excluding the legendary Empress Jingū, there were eight reigning empresses and their successors were most often selected from amongst the males of the paternal Imperial bloodline, which is why some conservative scholars argue that the women's reigns were temporary and that male-only succession tradition must be maintained in the 21st century.

See also
Empress of Japan
Emperor of Japan
List of emperors of Japan
Queen Himiko
Japan–Korea disputes

Notes

References

Further reading
 Aston, William George. (1896).  Nihongi: Chronicles of Japan from the Earliest Times to A.D. 697. London: Kegan Paul, Trench, Trubner. OCLC 448337491
 Brown, Delmer M. and Ichirō Ishida, eds. (1979).  Gukanshō: The Future and the Past. Berkeley: University of California Press. ; OCLC 251325323
 Chamberlain, Basil Hall. (1920). The Kojiki. Read before the Asiatic Society of Japan on April 12, May 10, and June 21, 1882; reprinted, May, 1919. OCLC 1882339
 Ponsonby-Fane, Richard Arthur Brabazon. (1959).  The Imperial House of Japan. Kyoto: Ponsonby Memorial Society. OCLC 194887
 Titsingh, Isaac. (1834). Nihon Ōdai Ichiran; ou,  Annales des empereurs du Japon.  Paris: Royal Asiatic Society, Oriental Translation Fund of Great Britain and Ireland. OCLC 5850691
 Varley, H. Paul. (1980).  Jinnō Shōtōki: A Chronicle of Gods and Sovereigns. New York: Columbia University Press. ; OCLC 59145842

External links

Women rulers in Japan
Legendary Emperors of Japan
Jingu, Empress
Jingu, Empress
Japanese empresses regnant
People of Yayoi-period Japan
3rd-century women rulers
3rd-century monarchs in Asia
3rd-century Japanese monarchs
Women in 3rd-century warfare
3rd-century Japanese women
Ancient Japanese women
Deified Japanese people
Hachiman faith
Japan–Korea relations
Japanese princesses
Deified Japanese people in the Kiki